The 2010 East Asian Judo Championships was contested in seven weight classes, seven each for men and women.

This competition was held at Tap Seac Multi-sports Pavilion in Macau, China, 19 and 20 June.

Medal overview

Men

Women

Medals table

External links
Judo Union of Asia

East Asian Judo Championships
Asian Championships, East
2010 Asian Championships, East
Judo Asian Championships, East
Judo 2010 Asian Championships, East